Gia Hilious Logous (Greek: Για Χίλιους Λόγους; English: Because Of Thousand Reasons) is the eighth studio album by popular Greek singer Nikos Oikonomopoulos, released on 17 November 2014 by Minos EMI. The album became the third certified four times platinum album by Oikonomopoulos.

Track listing

Singles
"Pote"
"Pote" was the first single released from the album. A music video for the song was directed by Konstantinos Rigos, released on 5 December 2014.

"Gia Hilious Logous"
"Gia Hilious Logous" was the second single from the album. The video clip of the song was released on 9 April 2015.

"Kane Afto Pou Xereis"
"Kane Afto Pou Xereis" was the third single from the album. It was released to all radio stations on 29 May 2015.

Chart performance

Personnel
Thanasis Papageorgiou – executive producer
Giannis Bournias – photography
Giannis Ioannidis, Petros Siakavellas – mastering
Takis Argiriou – mixing
Andreas Mouzakis, Dimitris Antoniadis – drums
Giannis Grigoriou, Telis Kafkas – bass
Giorgos Retikas – guitar

References

2014 albums
Nikos Oikonomopoulos albums
Minos EMI albums
Greek-language albums